Show & Tell is a Philippine television showbiz-oriented talk show broadcast by GMA Network. Hosted by Boy Abunda, Gretchen Barretto, Ai-Ai delas Alas and Lolit Solis, it premiered on July 16, 1994. The show concluded on October 1, 1995. It was replaced by Startalk in its timeslot.

Hosts

 Boy Abunda
 Gretchen Barretto
 Ai-Ai delas Alas

References

1994 Philippine television series debuts
1995 Philippine television series endings
Filipino-language television shows
GMA Network original programming
Philippine television talk shows